Orphinus (Picorphinus) guernei, is a species of skin beetle found in Sri Lanka.

Description
Total body length is about 2.5 mm. Body Oblong-oval, shiny, and finely and sparsely dotted with black and yellow pubescent. Body dorsally and ventrally dark brown. Head finely punctuate. Palpi brown. Eyes are very large, and clothed with brown setae. Antennae with 11 segments which are brown, and clothed with short brown setae. Scutellum triangular, with short light brown pubescence. Elytra densely foveolate with long brown pubescence. Epipleuron brownish. Legs brown, with light-brown pubescence. In male genitalia, parameres are slightly curved towards apex.

References 

Dermestidae
Insects of Sri Lanka
Insects described in 1916